Mike Giddings (born c. 1933) is a former American football player and coach and big wave surfer. He played collegiate football at the University of California-Berkeley. Giddings began his career as a head coach at Monrovia High in 1959, leading them to the CIF finals. In 1960, he was head coach at Glendale College, then after a year, John McKay hired him at USC, where he was the defensive coordinator when the Trojans won the 1962 national championship.

He later served as the head football coach at the University of Utah from 1966 to 1967, compiling a record of 9–12. From 1968 through 1973 he was the linebackers coach for the San Francisco 49ers, coaching Hall of Famer linebacker Dave Wilcox, Skip Vanderbundt, Frank Nunley, and others. The 49ers won the NFC West three times while Giddings was there and Wilcox went to the Pro Bowl every year. 

His time with the 49ers led Giddings to being named the head coach of The Hawaiians of the short-lived World Football League in 1974 and 1975. In 1976 Giddings was the NFL's first pro player personnel director.

In 1977 Giddings created an NFL talent evaluation and analytics company called Proscout, Inc., which is now owned and run by his son Mike Giddings, Jr. Among the first clients of Proscout were Don Shula, Paul Brown, and Bud Grant.

Giddings and Proscout are considered to be a pioneer in independent scouting and NFL analytics/moneyball and created terms used in the NFL to this day according to NFL analyst Charles Davis when he told a small group of scouts that “this man created the language we all use.”

Head coaching record

College

References

Living people
Year of birth missing (living people)
California Golden Bears football players
Denver Broncos coaches
San Francisco 49ers coaches
USC Trojans football coaches
Utah Utes football coaches
High school football coaches in California
Glendale Vaqueros football coaches
The Hawaiians coaches
United States Marine Corps officers